Paul Huff may refer to:
Paul B. Huff (1918–1994), United States Army soldier and Medal of Honor recipient
Paul Huff Parkway, Cleveland, Tennessee